Trichaetoides apicalis is a moth in the family Erebidae. It was described by Francis Walker in 1856. It is found on Sumatra and Borneo.

References

Moths described in 1856
Syntomini